T14 may refer to:

Aerospace 
 T14 (satellite), a DirecTV communications satellite
 Slingsby T.14 Gull II, a British glider
 Soyuz T-14, the 9th expedition to Salyut 7
 Taylor Airport (Quinlan, Texas)

Education 

 Top 14 Law Schools, the fourteen most prestigious law schools in the United States

Rail and transit

Lines 
 Rhode Island Avenue–New Carrollton Line, of the Washington Metropolitan Area Transit Authority
 T14 line, of the Stockholm Metro

Locomotives 
 Prussian T 14, a steam locomotive

Stations 
 Irinaka Station, Nagoya, Aichi Prefecture, Japan
 Nangō-Nana-Chōme Station, Sapporo, Hokkaido, Japan
 Nijōjō-mae Station, Kyoto, Japan
 Sembayashi-Omiya Station, Osaka, Japan
 Tōyōchō Station, Tokyo, Japan
 Tsuruwa Station, Sanuki, Kagawa Prefecture, Japan

Weapons and armor 
 Nambu T-14, a pistol
 Safir T-14, a shotgun
 T-14 Armata, a Russian main battle tank
 T14 Heavy Tank, a joint American and British project to develop a heavy tank
 T14 Light Tank, an American tankette

Other uses 
 Estonian national road 14
 
 Piper River language
 Sorex araneus coronavirus T14
 Throw stick (hieroglyph), an Egyptian hieroglyph
 Top Fourteen ranked law schools in the United States